The Simmons Bank Open is a golf tournament on the Korn Ferry Tour. It was first played in June 2016 at the Nashville Golf & Athletic Club in Nashville, Tennessee.

Winners

Bolded golfers graduated to the PGA Tour via the Korn Ferry Tour regular-season money list.

References

External links

Coverage on the Korn Ferry Tour's official site

Korn Ferry Tour events
Golf in Tennessee
Sports in Nashville, Tennessee
Recurring sporting events established in 2016
2016 establishments in Tennessee